Veneberg is a surname. Notable people with the surname include:

Berend Veneberg (born 1963), Dutch strongman and powerlifter
Thorwald Veneberg (born 1977), Dutch cyclist